Chariesthes is a genus of longhorn beetles of the subfamily Lamiinae, containing the following species:

subgenus Chariesthes
 Chariesthes amoena (Dalman, 1817)
 Chariesthes analis (Jordan, 1894)
 Chariesthes antennata Jordan, 1894
 Chariesthes argentea Hintz, 1912
 Chariesthes atroapicalis Breuning, 1951
 Chariesthes basiflavipennis Breuning, 1938
 Chariesthes bechynei Breuning, 1953
 Chariesthes bella (Dalman, 1817)
 Chariesthes fairmairei (Aurivillius, 1922)
 Chariesthes formosa Jordan, 1894
 Chariesthes freya Jordan, 1894
 Chariesthes gestroi Breuning, 1934
 Chariesthes grisescens (Breuning, 1981)
 Chariesthes insularis Breuning, 1939
 Chariesthes kochi Breuning, 1962
 Chariesthes leonensis Breuning, 1939
 Chariesthes lomii Breuning, 1938
 Chariesthes maublanci Lepesme & Breuning, 1950
 Chariesthes maynei Breuning, 1952
 Chariesthes multinotata Chevrolat, 1858
 Chariesthes nigronotata Breuning, 1956
 Chariesthes nigropunctata Breuning, 1934
 Chariesthes pulchelloides Breuning, 1939
 Chariesthes richteri Quedenfeldt, 1887
 Chariesthes rubida (Chevrolat, 1855)
 Chariesthes ruficollis Breuning, 1942
 Chariesthes rutila (Jordan, 1894)
 Chariesthes schatzmayri Breuning, 1940
 Chariesthes sesensis (Hintz, 1912)
 Chariesthes somaliensis Breuning, 1934
 Chariesthes striata Fiedler, 1939
 Chariesthes subtricolor Breuning, 1967
 Chariesthes trivitticollis Breuning, 1977

subgenus Peritragopsis
 Chariesthes ficivora (Pascoe, 1864)

subgenus Peritragus
 Chariesthes apicalis (Péringuey, 1885)
 Chariesthes ertli (Aurivillius, 1913)
 Chariesthes interruptevitticollis Breuning, 1960
 Chariesthes laetula (Péringuey, 1899)
 Chariesthes nigroapicalis (Aurivillius, 1903)
 Chariesthes obliquevittata Breuning, 1960
 Chariesthes similis Breuning, 1938

subgenus Pseudoapheniastus
 Chariesthes albovariegata (Breuning, 1938)
 Chariesthes angolensis Breuning, 1968
 Chariesthes cervina (Hintz, 1910)
 Chariesthes chassoti Breuning, 1969
 Chariesthes congoensis Breuning, 1948
 Chariesthes donovani (Jordan, 1903)
 Chariesthes euchroma (Fairmaire, 1904)
 Chariesthes nigroapicipennis Breuning, 1977
 Chariesthes obscura (Gahan, 1890)
 Chariesthes rubra (Hintz, 1912)

subgenus Sokothesthes
 Chariesthes socotraensis Adlbauer, 2002

References

 
Tragocephalini
Cerambycidae genera